The 1963 CFL season is considered to be the tenth season in modern-day Canadian football, although it is officially the sixth Canadian Football League season.

CFL News in 1963
Charter Membership into the Canadian Football Hall of Fame started on June 19.

Average attendance exceeded 20,000 spectators per game for the first time in league history. The league has consistently drawn at least that number of fans to its games ever since.

Regular season standings

Final regular season standings
Note: GP = Games Played, W = Wins, L = Losses, T = Ties, PF = Points For, PA = Points Against, Pts = Points

Bold text means that they have clinched the playoffs.
 British Columbia and Hamilton have first round byes.

Grey Cup playoffs
Note: All dates in 1963

Conference Semi-Finals

Conference Finals

Playoff bracket

Grey Cup Championship

CFL Leaders
 CFL Passing Leaders
 CFL Rushing Leaders
 CFL Receiving Leaders

1963 CFL All-Stars

Offence
QB – Joe Kapp, BC Lions
RB – Dick Shatto, Toronto Argonauts
RB – Willie Fleming, BC Lions
RB – George Dixon, Montreal Alouettes
RB – Lovell Coleman, Calgary Stampeders
SE – Hal Patterson, Hamilton Tiger-Cats
TE – Pete Manning, Calgary Stampeders
C – Milt Crain, Montreal Alouettes
OG – Tony Pajaczkowski, Calgary Stampeders
OG – Tom Hinton, BC Lions
OT – Roger Kramer, Ottawa Rough Riders
OT – Lonnie Dennis, BC Lions

Defence
DT – Don Luzzi, Calgary Stampeders
DT – Angelo Mosca, Hamilton Tiger-Cats
DE – Garner Ekstran, Saskatchewan Roughriders
DE – Dick Fouts, BC Lions
MG – John Barrow, Hamilton Tiger-Cats
LB – Tom Brown, BC Lions
LB – Jim Andreotti, Montreal Alouettes
LB – Jim Conroy, Ottawa Rough Riders
LB – Norm Fieldgate, BC Lions
DB – Garney Henley, Hamilton Tiger-Cats
DB – Harvey Wylie, Calgary Stampeders
DB – Dick Thornton, Winnipeg Blue Bombers

1963 Eastern All-Stars

Offence
QB – Russ Jackson, Ottawa Rough Riders
RB – Dick Shatto, Toronto Argonauts
RB – Dave Thelen, Ottawa Rough Riders
RB – George Dixon, Montreal Alouettes
F – Tommy Grant, Hamilton Tiger-Cats
SE – Hal Patterson, Hamilton Tiger-Cats
TE – Ted Watkins, Ottawa Rough Riders
C – Milt Crain, Montreal Alouettes
OG – Chuck Walton, Montreal Alouettes
OG – Ellison Kelly, Hamilton Tiger-Cats
OT – Roger Kramer, Ottawa Rough Riders
OT – Hardiman Cureton, Hamilton Tiger-Cats

Defence
DT – Ed Nickla, Montreal Alouettes
DT – Angelo Mosca, Hamilton Tiger-Cats
DE – Billy Joe Booth, Ottawa Rough Riders
DE – John Autry, Toronto Argonauts
MG – John Barrow, Hamilton Tiger-Cats
LB – Jim Reynolds, Montreal Alouettes
LB – Jim Andreotti, Montreal Alouettes
LB – Jim Conroy, Ottawa Rough Riders
LB – Gene Gaines, Ottawa Rough Riders
DB – Garney Henley, Hamilton Tiger-Cats
DB – Joe Poirier, Ottawa Rough Riders
DB – Jim Rountree, Toronto Argonauts

1963 Western All-Stars

Offence
QB – Joe Kapp, BC Lions
RB – Nub Beamer, BC Lions
RB – Willie Fleming, BC Lions
RB – Jim Dillard, Calgary Stampeders
RB – Lovell Coleman, Calgary Stampeders
SE – Farrell Funston, Winnipeg Blue Bombers
TE – Pete Manning, Calgary Stampeders
C – Neil Habig, Saskatchewan Roughriders
OG – Tony Pajaczkowski, Calgary Stampeders
OG – Tom Hinton, BC Lions
OT – Al Benecick, Saskatchewan Roughriders
OT – Lonnie Dennis, BC Lions

Defence
DT – Don Luzzi, Calgary Stampeders
DT – Bill Clarke, Saskatchewan Roughriders
DE – Garner Ekstran, Saskatchewan Roughriders
DE – Dick Fouts, BC Lions
MG – Ron Atchison, Saskatchewan Roughriders
LB – Tom Brown, BC Lions
LB – Wayne Harris, Calgary Stampeders
LB – Wayne Shaw, Saskatchewan Roughriders
LB – Norm Fieldgate, BC Lions
DB – Dale West, Saskatchewan Roughriders
DB – Dick Thornton, Winnipeg Blue Bombers
S – Harvey Wylie, Calgary Stampeders

1963 CFL Awards
 CFL's Most Outstanding Player Award – Russ Jackson (QB), Ottawa Rough Riders
 CFL's Most Outstanding Canadian Award – Russ Jackson (QB), Ottawa Rough Riders
 CFL's Most Outstanding Lineman Award – Tom Brown (LB), BC Lions
 CFL's Coach of the Year – Dave Skrien, BC Lions
 Jeff Russel Memorial Trophy (Eastern MVP) – Garney Henley (DB), Hamilton Tiger-Cats
 Jeff Nicklin Memorial Trophy (Western MVP) - Joe Kapp (QB), BC Lions
 Gruen Trophy (Eastern Rookie of the Year) - Rick Black (P/FB), Ottawa Rough Riders
 Dr. Beattie Martin Trophy (Western Rookie of the Year) - Peter Kempf (FB/K), BC Lions
 DeMarco–Becket Memorial Trophy (Western Outstanding Lineman) - Tom Brown (LB), BC Lions

References 

Canadian Football League seasons
CFL